Plagiostropha sinecosta is a species of sea snail, a marine gastropod mollusk in the family Drilliidae.

Description

Distribution

References

  Tucker, J.K. 2004 Catalog of recent and fossil turrids (Mollusca: Gastropoda). Zootaxa 682:1–1295

External links

sinecosta
Gastropods of Australia
Gastropods described in 1991